The Austria Davis Cup team represents Austria in the Davis Cup and is governed by Tennis Austria. In 2010 Austria was re-promoted to the World Group after being relegated to the Europa/Africa Zone Group I only one year earlier. In 2012, Austria advanced to the World Group quarterfinals for the first time since 1995, eventually losing against Spain.

History
Austria competed in its first Davis Cup in 1905.

The Austrian team achieved their best Davis Cup result in 1990, when they were on the brink of reaching the final, playing their semi final against the USA on clay in Vienna, with a team consisting of Thomas Muster, Horst Skoff and Alex Antonitsch. After Muster had won his singles rubbers against Michael Chang and Andre Agassi, the standing in the tie was 2:2. Skoff and Chang met each other in the decisive fifth rubber, with Skoff taking a 2 set lead, and trying to close out the third set as the daylight faded. Skoff failed to do this and Chang took the third set, with the match then postponed until the next day, with Skoff leading 2 sets to 1 overnight. Skoff needed to win 1 more set to send Austria into the final, but the final 2 sets were both won by Chang, so Austria went out and the USA reached the final.

Current squad

* Win–loss records are as of 29 November and rankings are as of 22 November 2021.

Recent performances
Here is the list of all match-ups since 1981, when the competition started being held in the current World Group format.

1980s

1990s

2000s

2010s

2020s

External links

Davis Cup teams
Davis Cup
Tennis in Austria